"A Public Affair" is a song by American singer Jessica Simpson. It was co-written by Simpson and produced by Lester Mendez, for Simpson's fourth studio album of the same title. It was released as the album's first single (second overall) on June 29, 2006, by Epic Records. The synth-pop track samples the composition of "Ain't No Mountain High Enough" by Diana Ross and interpolates the Madonna classic "Holiday". It was also compared to Janet Jackson. Lyrically, the song speaks about having fun with friends.

"A Public Affair" received mixed reviews from critics, with many criticizing its close similarity with "Holiday". The song reached the top 10 in Canada, Ireland and Scotland and made the top 20 in US, Australia and UK. The song also topped the Billboard Hot Dance Club Play chart, becoming Simpson's first number one on the chart. The song ranked at number 51 on Top 100 Pop Songs of 2006 by About.com.

Composition

"A Public Affair" lasts for three minutes and 21 seconds. Musically, it is a synth-pop song with a moderate dance groove. The song features a melody, arrangement and instrumentation; the latter are reminiscent of the classic Madonna song "Holiday" (1983). The song also contains a retro percussion breakdown and a springy, rubbery bassline. At the end of the song, the background vocalists sing a few lines of "Aaah-Aaah-Aaah" which is a line borrowed from the Diana Ross's "Ain't No Mountain High Enough". According to the sheet music published at Musicnotes.com by EMI Music Publishing, the song is written in the key of D major. It follows a chord progression of G–A–Fm–Bm, and the song is set in common time with a tempo of 124 beats per minute. Simpson's breathy vocals recall Janet Jackson, spanning from a low note of A3 to a high note of B4.

Critical reception
Chuck Taylor of Billboard magazine called the song's production "wildly adventurous" and "maddeningly catchy", and the song itself "A perfect record." About.com's Bill Lamb gave the song 4 out of 5 stars, saying that is "one of the best pop singles of her career" and citing that the song "follows a classic disco game plan even including a retro percussion breakdown. The icing on the cake is a line borrowed from the Diana Ross version of 'Ain't No Mountain High Enough'. As it is, 'A Public Affair' is perfect for early evening party play. With some beefing up, it can easily become a peak hour dance hit". Teen People called the song a fun, frothy dance track reminiscent of early Madonna; some in the media have criticized the unoriginality of the song because of its strong similarity to Madonna's "Holiday". "A Public Affair" received numerous comparisons to Janet Jackson, considered to reference "classic Janet" for its "breathy vocals, cheery, almost sickeningly sweet melody," and "mid-song giggle." Newsday also described it as "channeling Janet-era Jackson."

Commercial release
The Yahoo! Music download of the song gained media attention because it was made available in MP3 format, without Digital Rights Management, which is normally used to restrict copying of commercially released singles. However, the price to download the song was $1.99, higher than the $0.99 norm for most DRM-restricted tracks. The increased price was rationalized not by the DRM-free format, but by offering users the ability to "personalize" the song with a specific name. The single was released in North America and Australia in 2006. Later the song was released in Europe in February 2007.

Chart performance

North America
In the United States, the single debuted at number 39 on the Billboard Hot 100, on the issue dated July 15, 2006. Simpson's second-highest debut after "These Boots Are Made for Walkin'". It had previously debuted at number 20 on Billboard's Bubbling Under Hot 100 Singles chart, which represents the 25 singles below the Hot 100's number 100 position that have not yet appeared on the Hot 100. Digital download sales were moderate until the release of the single's music video. On August 12, 2006, the single peaked at number 14 and was awarded the honor of that week's Greatest Gainer Digital. In that week, "A Public Affair" moved from 30 to 14, beating her sister Ashlee, who ascended seven places 28–21 with "Invisible", while Paris Hilton moved up one place 29–28 with "Stars Are Blind". The single became Simpson's sixth top 20 single in the US and her third song to reach number 14 tied with "With You" (2004) and "These Boots Are Made for Walkin'" (2005). The single stayed on the chart for twelve weeks. The song also peaked at number 16 on Billboard Pop Songs chart and was her fifth top 20 on the chart, since "Take My Breath Away" (2004). Due to the strong digital sales, the single was certified Gold by RIAA for selling 500,000 copies. As the date, the song is her third best selling digital single with 890,000 copies sold.

On the Hot Digital Songs chart, "A Public Affair" climbed from number 16 to six in its fifth week on the chart, seeing a 100% increase in digital download sales of 58,000 units sold. The single became her second-highest peak position on the chart after "These Boots Are Made for Walkin'" (2005). With this entry, "A Public Affair" joined Ashlee Simpson's song "Invisible" in the top ten on the US iTunes Store's list of most popular songs, the first time in iTunes history that two siblings had different songs in the top 10. "A Public Affair" was a successful on the club charts. On Hot Dance Club Play chart, the single peaked at number one by October 7, 2006. It was her first number one on the chart. The song also peaked at number six on the Hot Dance Airplay chart. In Canada, "A Public Affair" became Simpson's third top ten single after "Take My Breath Away" (2004), peaking at number eight by July 2006, due its strong digital sales.

Oceania and Europe
In Australia, the single debuted at number 18 on the ARIA Charts for the week of August 13, 2006. The next week, it peaked at number 17 and stayed on the chart for ten weeks. The single became her seventh top 20 single in that country.

"A Public Affair" was released in Europe by early 2007. In Sweden, the single made its chart debut on the issue dated January 4, 2007, at number 43. The next week peaked at number 36. In Ireland, the song debuted at number nine on the issue date February 8, 2007. It was her second highest peak in that country after "These Boots Are Made for Walkin'" (2005).

In the United Kingdom, the song debuted at number 20 on the issue dated February 17, 2007. The single stayed on the chart for four weeks. It became her sixth and last top 20 there. Outside the United Kingdom, "A Public Affair" has also charted in other European countries including Czech Republic, Hungary, Romania and Germany.

Music video

The song's music video was shot on June 23, 2006, and the late evening of June 24, 2006, at the Moonlight Rollerway in Glendale, California. It features appearances by Christina Applegate, Christina Milian, Eva Longoria, Maria Menounos, Andy Dick and Ryan Seacrest. It introduces Australian Reshad Strik, whose participation precipitated many comments on his resemblance to Nick Lachey, Simpson's ex-husband, and Menounos, who resembled Vanessa Minnillo, who was dating Lachey at the time Simpson split with her ex-husband. The video was directed by Brett Ratner. According with MTV, the music video was heavily influenced by Olivia Newton-John's "Xanadu" and some Madonna's videos like "Sorry" and "Music" taking references to choreographed roller-skating and celeb making a cameo as the star's chauffeur, respectively.

Yahoo! Launch had managed to make a "Fans Version Only" version of the video as well, which instantly reached number one.

On July 19, Simpson visited MTV's Total Request Live to world premiere the video. The following day the video entered the TRL countdown at number six, the highest debut for any Simpson video; on its third day on the countdown, it reached number two. The video spent a total of 28 days on the TRL countdown, making it her most successful video to date on TRL. The video reached number eight on Canada's MuchMusic chart. In the chart Billboard Hot Videoclip Tracks peaked at the number 5.

Credits and personnel
Vocals: Jessica Simpson
Songwriting: Jessica Simpson, Johntá Austin, Greg Kurstin, Sam Watters, Louis Biancaniello, Lester Mendez, Nickolas Ashford, Valerie Simpson
Production: Lester Mendez

Credits adapted from A Public Affair liner notes.

Track listings and formats
 Australian CD single
 "A Public Affair" (radio edit)
 "A Public Affair" (extended version)
 "A Public Affair" (karaoke version)

 Maxi CD single
 "A Public Affair" (radio edit)
 "A Public Affair" (extended version)
 "A Public Affair" (instrumental version)
 "A Public Affair" (remix)
 "A Public Affair" (video)

 UK and German CD single
 "A Public Affair"
 "A Public Affair" (Alex Greggs Remix)

Charts

Weekly charts

Year-end charts

Certifications

Release history

See also
 List of number-one dance singles of 2006 (U.S.)

References

2006 singles
2006 songs
Jessica Simpson songs
Epic Records singles
American synth-pop songs
Music videos directed by Brett Ratner
Songs written by Nickolas Ashford
Songs written by Valerie Simpson
Songs written by Lester Mendez
Songs written by Sam Watters
Songs written by Louis Biancaniello
Songs written by Johntá Austin
Song recordings produced by Lester Mendez
Songs written by Greg Kurstin